Christopher Patrick O'Brien (born August 5, 1964) is an American retired rugby union player who played at fly-half and centre and later served as an assistant coach for the United States national rugby union team.

Early life and career 
O'Brien was born in Palo Alto (CA), United States on August 5, 1964.

He made his debut for the United States national rugby union team on June 11, 1988.

He made a total of 22 official appearances for the USA Eagles, including two games at the 1991 Rugby World Cup and one game for the 1995 Rugby World Cup Qualifier.

O'Brien is fifth on the USA Eagles' list of all-time leading scorers with 144 points.

He served as the kicking coach for the USA Eagles in 2015.

See also 

United States national rugby union team

References 

American rugby union players
Rugby union fly-halves
Living people
1964 births
United States international rugby union players